The Security Academy is a public institution in Albania aimed at educating employees of the State Police and other law enforcement agencies. It provides programs for training and qualifications at the Basic Police School level. Theory-practice learning can last 2 academic years and trainees benefit up to 120 credits (ECTS). Those who graduate, receive a professional diploma of a basic level police officer.

See also
 List of universities in Albania
 Quality Assurance Agency of Higher Education

References

Universities in Albania
Law enforcement in Albania
Albania